Angel Pumpalov (born 20 February 1978) is a Bulgarian alpine skier. He competed at the 1998 Winter Olympics and the 2002 Winter Olympics.

References

External links
 

1978 births
Living people
Bulgarian male alpine skiers
Olympic alpine skiers of Bulgaria
Alpine skiers at the 1998 Winter Olympics
Alpine skiers at the 2002 Winter Olympics
People from Razlog
Sportspeople from Blagoevgrad Province